Michael Anthony Rayer (born 21 July 1965) is a former Wales international rugby union player. A full-back, he played his club rugby for Cardiff RFC and Bedford. He is currently coach to Bedford Blues. A talented and popular player, he played during a period where there was little success in Welsh rugby.  He is commonly remembered for scoring two tries as a replacement wing against Scotland in 1994 (replacing fellow Cardiff player Nigel Walker). As tactical substitutions were not allowed at that time scores from replacements were still relatively rare.

Notes

1965 births
Welsh rugby union coaches
Welsh rugby union players
Wales international rugby union players
Bedford Blues players
Cardiff RFC players
Living people